The 6mm AR is a centerfire wildcat cartridge initially designed by Robert Whitley for long-range performance in an AR-15 rifle.

Description
The cartridge uses a 6.5 Grendel case that has been necked-down to accept a 6.2 mm (.243 in) bullet.

The 6mm AR takes advantage of the wide variety of 6.2 mm (.243 in) caliber bullets. Slim, long bullets with high ballistic coefficient are ideal for energy retention at long ranges.

It is similar to the 6PDK which also uses a 6.2 mm bullet and a similar muzzle energy and case capacity to the 6mm AR and 6.5 Grendel, in a casing somewhat popular for the AR-15, a necked-down 6.8mm Remington SPC casing.

6mm AR Turbo 40 Improved
This variant uses an Ackley Improved fire formed case with less tapering and a 40-degree higher shoulder permitting a larger powder capacity.

6mm Rat and FatRat
These wildcats also push forward the shoulder of the same necked Grendel case similar to the Turbo 40, yielding more powder capacity.  or heavier grain VLD boat-tail bullets have to be seated deeply within the case neck, however, rendering some of these volume gains illusory but there is an increase in volume even with the longer bullets nonetheless.

6mm Grinch
Similar to the 6mm Turbo 40 and 6mm FatRat, the 6mm Grinch has a blown-forward shoulder on par with the 6mm Dasher to eke maximum powder capacity from the necked Grendel case.

See also
6mm ARC
6mm Optimum
.223 Remington
List of rifle cartridges
Glossary of firearms terminology

References 

Pistol and rifle cartridges
Wildcat cartridges